Ogmophora peringueyi is a species of beetle in the family Carabidae, the only species in the genus Ogmophora.

References

Pterostichinae